The Grey Cup's Most Valuable Player (MVP) award is awarded annually since 1959 to the player of the winning team who deemed to have had the best performance in the Grey Cup Game, the Canadian Football League's championship game. This award is presented before the Grey Cup trophy is presented.

Canadians are eligible for the award but have seldom hoisted it due to American players' dominance in the league. Andrew Harris, after winning the Grey Cup with the Winnipeg Blue Bombers in 2019, became the first player to win both the Grey Cup Most Valuable Player and the Dick Suderman Trophy in the same edition of the championship.

Grey Cup Most Valuable Player Award winners

 - Denotes award winner came from losing team

See also
Grey Cup Most Valuable Canadian

References

M
Canadian Football League trophies and awards
Most valuable player awards